I Am the Man is a 1924 American silent drama film directed by Ivan Abramson and starring Lionel Barrymore, Seena Owen, and Gaston Glass.

Plot
As described in a review in a film magazine, James McQuade (Barrymore), the political boss of a large city, falls in love with Julia Calvert (Owen), who is engaged to Daniel Harrington (Glass). By framing her father so that he is facing prison, James forces Julia to marry him to save her father. James’ brother Robert (Faust) falls in love with Julia and his attentions become obnoxious. Julia never becomes reconciled to her husband, and Robert finally instills into James’ mind the thought that she still loves Harrington. Through a ruse, James comes on a party which includes Robert, and Corinne (le Breton), a chorus girl, finds Robert making love to Julia and shoots him. Corinne is found with the revolver in her hand, and tried for the murder. During the trial James discovers Corinne is actually his own daughter, and persuades the judge to postpone the trial for one day. That night he sends for Harrington, the district attorney, and Corinne. James then takes poison and dies leaving a confession which reads: “I am the man.” Julia finds happiness with Harrington and Corinne marries her sweetheart Billy.

Cast

Preservation
With no prints of I Am the Man located in any film archives, it is a lost film.

References

Bibliography
 Munden, Kenneth White. The American Film Institute Catalog of Motion Pictures Produced in the United States, Part 1. University of California Press, 1997.

External links

1924 films
1924 drama films
American silent feature films
American drama films
Films directed by Ivan Abramson
American black-and-white films
1920s English-language films
1920s American films
Silent American drama films